CHOP is the acronym for a chemotherapy regimen used in the treatment of non-Hodgkin lymphoma.  CHOP consists of:
 Cyclophosphamide, an alkylating agent which damages DNA by binding to it and causing the formation of cross-links
  (also called doxorubicin or adriamycin), an intercalating agent which damages DNA by inserting itself between DNA bases
  (vincristine), which prevents cells from duplicating by binding to the protein tubulin

Sometimes the chimeric anti-CD20 monoclonal antibody, rituximab, is added to this treatment regimen to form the R-CHOP regimen.

Dosing regimen 

R-Maxi-CHOP is used in mantle cell lymphoma and is given in 21-day intervals, alternating with R-HDAC (rituximab + high-dose cytarabine).

In most other non-Hodgkin lymphomas (excluding some aggressive forms), standard-dose [R]-CHOP is generally used as first-line therapy.

Uses and indications
Normal cells are more able than cancer cells to repair damage from chemotherapy drugs.

This regimen can also be combined with the monoclonal antibody rituximab if the lymphoma is of B cell origin; this combination is called R-CHOP. Typically, courses are administered at an interval of two or three weeks (CHOP-14 and CHOP-21 respectively). A staging CT scan is generally performed after three cycles to assess whether the disease is responding to treatment.

In patients with a history of cardiovascular disease, doxorubicin (which is cardiotoxic) is often deemed to be too great a risk and is omitted from the regimen. The combination is then referred to as COP (cyclophosphamide, Oncovin, and prednisone or prednisolone) or CVP (cyclophosphamide, vincristine, and prednisone or prednisolone).

Side-effects and complications
The combination is generally well tolerated. Chemotherapy-induced nausea and vomiting may require antiemetics (such as ondansetron), and hemorrhagic cystitis is prevented with administration of mesna. Alopecia (hair loss) is common.

Neutropenia generally develops in the second week. During this period, many clinicians recommend pegfilgrastim or prophylactic use of ciprofloxacin. If a fever develops in the neutropenic period, urgent medical assessment is required for neutropenic sepsis, as infections in patients with low neutrophil counts may progress rapidly.

Allopurinol is typically co-administered prophylactically to prevent hyperuricemia that results from tumor lysis syndrome, the result of rapid death of tumor cells.

History
A pivotal study published in 1993 compared CHOP to several other chemotherapy regimens (e.g. m-BACOD, ProMACE-CytaBOM, MACOP-B) for advanced non-Hodgkin's lymphoma. CHOP emerged as the regimen with the least toxicity but similar efficacy.

However, in Germany in 2012, bendamustine has displaced [R-]CHOP to become the first line treatment of choice for indolent lymphoma (a less aggressive subset of non-Hodgkin lymphoma).

[R]-CHOEP modification 

In order to develop more effective first-line chemotherapy regimen for aggressive lymphomas, some researchers tried to add  to the standard [R]-CHOP regimen.

There were also attempts to further improve the efficacy of the [R]-CHOEP regimen with escalating the chemotherapy doses. This mode was called [R]-High-CHOEP. However, it did not show more effectiveness than standard-dose [R]-CHOEP while adding more toxicity and cost.

In order to try improving efficacy of the [R]-CHOEP, some researchers tried to escalate chemotherapy to very high doses, requiring autologous stem cell support in each cycle. Doses in that regimen were increased from cycle to cycle. This regimen was called [R]-MegaCHOEP. But again, such escalation seemed to not improve effectiveness while adding toxicity.

See also
 Chemotherapy regimens
 EPOCH chemotherapy

References
  
 

Chemotherapy regimens used in lymphoma